Parkgate and Rawmarsh railway station, originally named Rawmarsh was situated in Parkgate, adjacent to the Park Gate Iron and Steel Company's works. It served the communities of Parkgate and Rawmarsh, in South Yorkshire, England.

The station was situated on the former North Midland Railway between Kilnhurst West and Rotherham Masborough.

On 19 November 1926, a private owner wagon disintegrated, derailing the train that it was part of. A signal post was partially brought down, obstructing an adjacent line. An express passenger train had the sides of its carriages ripped open by the signal post. Eleven people were killed.

The station was closed, along with all the others on the line, except for Rotherham Masborough on 1 January 1968. The last ticket to be issued, as a souvenir, was lettered L.M.S.R., 20 years after that company's demise.

The station and the adjoining steel works, together with other locations in the Rotherham area, were featured in the 1958 film Tread Softly Stranger starring Diana Dors.  Diana Dors's co-star George Baker is seen arriving at platform 1 of "Rawborough" station.

References

External links
 Station on navigable O.S. map. Station is the open one (on this map) next to the closed Parkgate and Aldwarke station.

Disused railway stations in Rotherham
Railway stations in Great Britain opened in 1841
Railway stations in Great Britain closed in 1968
Former Midland Railway stations
1926 disasters in the United Kingdom